Whitechapel is a district in East London and the future administrative centre of the London Borough of Tower Hamlets. Part of the historic county of Middlesex, the area formed a civil and ecclesiastical parish after splitting from the ancient parish of Stepney in the 14th century. It became part of the County of London in 1889 and Greater London in 1965. Because the area is close to the London Docklands and east of the City of London, it has been a popular place for immigrants and the working class.

The area was the centre of the London Jewish community in the 19th and early 20th centuries. Whitechapel, along with the neighbouring district of Spitalfields, were the location of the infamous 11 Whitechapel murders (1888–91), some of which were attributed to the unidentified serial killer known as Jack the Ripper. In the latter half of the 20th century, Whitechapel became a significant settlement for the British Bangladeshi community and has the Royal London Hospital and East London Mosque.

History

Origin and toponymy

Whitechapel was originally part of the Manor and Parish of Stepney, but population growth resulting from its position just outside the Aldgate on the Roman Road to Essex resulted in significant population growth, so a chapel of ease, dedicated to St Mary was established so people did not have to make the longer journey to Stepney's parish church St Dunstans. The earliest known rector was Hugh de Fulbourne in 1329.

Whitechapel takes its name from that church church, St Mary Matfelon, which like the nearby White Tower of the Tower of London was at one time whitewashed to give it a prominent and attractive appearance. The etymology of the Matfelon element is unclear and apparently unique. 

Around 1338, Whitechapel became an independent parish, with St Mary Matfelon, originally a chapel of ease within Stepney, becoming the parish church.

Administrative history

The area became an independent parish around 1338. At that time parish areas only had an ecclesiastical (church) function, with parallel civil parishes being formed in the Tudor period. The original purpose of the civil parishes was poor relief. The area was part of the historic (or ancient) county of Middlesex, but military and most (or all) civil county functions were managed more locally, by the Tower Division (also known as the Tower Hamlets).

The role of the Tower Division ended when Whitechapel became part of the new County of London in 1889, and most civil parish functions were removed when the area joined the Metropolitan Borough of Stepney in 1900.

In 1965 there was a further round of changes when the Metropolitan Borough of Stepney merged with the Metropolitan Borough of Bethnal Green and the Metropolitan Borough of Poplar to form the new London Borough of Tower Hamlets. The new borough of Tower Hamlets covered only part of the historic Tower Division (or Tower Hamlets). At the same time, the area became part of the new Greater London, which replaced the older, smaller County of London.

Before the 19th century

Whitechapel, along with areas such as neighbouring Shoreditch, Holborn (west of the city) and Southwark (south of the Thames), was one of London's earlier extra-mural suburbs. Beyond controls of the City of London Corporation, Whitechapel was used for more polluting and land-intensive industries the city market demanded; such as tanneries, builders' goods yards, laundries, clothes dyers, slaughterhouse-related work such as soaperies and breweries. Whitechapel was strongly notable for foundries, foremost of which was the Whitechapel Bell Foundry, which later cast Philadelphia's Liberty Bell, Westminster's Big Ben, Bow Bells and more recently the London Olympic Bell in 2012.

In 1797, the body of the sailor Richard Parker, hanged for his leading role in the Nore mutiny, was given a Christian burial at Whitechapel after his wife exhumed it from the unconsecrated burial ground to which it was originally consigned. Crowds gathered to see the body before it was buried.

Davenant Foundation School

In 1680, the local Rector Ralph Davenant (of the parish of Whitechapel), his wife and sister-in-law, bequeathed a large sum for a schoolmaster to teach literacy, numeracy and the "principles of the Church of England" to forty boys of the parish. In the same deed Henry and Sarah Gullifer undertook to provide for the education of thirty poor girls; namely a schoolmistress was to teach them the" catechism, reading, knitting, plain sewing, and any other useful work".  In 1701 an unknown donor gave the foundation £1,000 so the children might be suitably clothed as well as educated.  Between 1783 and 1830 the school received a score of gifts totalling over £5,000.  Typical income seems to have been the very good sum of about £500 per year, which was much more than most vicar's and rector's livings, net. Supporting modern education, the Davenant Centre continues and the Davenant Foundation School stands in Loughton which is narrowly in Essex and served by the London Underground, since 1966.

Expansion of population and small industries
Population shifts from rural areas to London from the 17th century to the mid-19th century resulted in great numbers of more or less destitute people taking up residence amidst the industries, businesses and services ancillary to the City of London that had attracted them.

19th century
In common with many other parts of the East End of London, Victorian Whitechapel gained a reputation for severe poverty, overcrowding, and the social problems that came with it. Settled residents of Whitechapel Road are colour-coded red in the inset map, showing their reliable, moderate-to-good income as at 1889; the smaller backstreets were colour-coded black to reflect their greater poverty.

William Booth began his Christian Revival Society, preaching the gospel in a tent, erected in the Friends Burial Ground, Thomas Street, Whitechapel, in 1865. Others joined his Christian Mission, and on 7 August 1878 the Salvation Army was formed at a meeting held at 272 Whitechapel Road. A statue commemorates both his mission and his work in helping the poor.

In this Victorian era the basal population of poor English country stock was swelled by immigrants from all over, particularly Irish and Jewish. Writing of the period 1883–1884, Yiddish theatre actor Jacob Adler wrote, "The further we penetrated into this Whitechapel, the more our hearts sank. Was this London? Never in Russia, never later in the worst slums of New York, were we to see such poverty as in the London of the 1880s."

This endemic poverty drove many women to prostitution. In October 1888 the Metropolitan Police estimated that there were 1,200 prostitutes "of very low class" resident in Whitechapel and about 62 brothels. Reference is specifically made to them in Charles Booth's Life and Labour of the People in London, specially to dwellings called Blackwall Buildings belonging to Blackwall Railway. Such prostitutes were numbered amongst the 11 Whitechapel murders (1888–91), some of which were committed by the legendary serial killer known as "Jack the Ripper". These attacks caused widespread terror in the district and throughout the country and drew the attention of social reformers to the squalor and vice of the area, even though these crimes remain unsolved today. 

London County Council, founded 1889, helped deliver investment in new housing and slum clearance; objectives which were a popular cause at the time.
 
The "Elephant Man" Joseph Merrick (1862–1890) became well known in Whitechapel – he was exhibited in a shop on the Whitechapel Road before being helped by Frederick Treves (1853–1923) at the Royal London Hospital, opposite the actual shop. There is a museum in the hospital about his life.

20th century
In 1902, American author Jack London, looking to write a counterpart to Jacob Riis's seminal book How the Other Half Lives, donned ragged clothes and boarded in Whitechapel, detailing his experiences in The People of the Abyss. Riis had recently documented the astoundingly bad conditions in large swathes of the leading city of the United States.

The Siege of Sidney Street in January 1911 was a gunfight between police and military forces, and Latvian revolutionaries. Then Home Secretary Winston Churchill took over the operation, and his presence caused a political row over the level of his involvement during the time. His biographers disagreed and claimed that he gave no operational commands to the police,  but a Metropolitan Police account states that the events of Sidney Street were "a very rare case of a Home Secretary taking police operational command decisions".

The Freedom Press, a socialist publishing house, thought it worthwhile to explore conditions in the leading city of the nation that had invented modern capitalism. He concluded that English poverty was far rougher than the American variety. The juxtaposition of the poverty, homelessness, exploitative work conditions, prostitution, and infant mortality of Whitechapel and other East End locales with some of the greatest personal wealth the world has ever seen made it a focal point for leftist reformers and revolutionaries of all kinds, from George Bernard Shaw, whose Fabian Society met regularly in Whitechapel, to Vladimir Lenin, led rallies in Whitechapel during his exile from Russia. The area is still home to Freedom Press, the anarchist publishing house founded by Charlotte Wilson.

On Sunday 4 October 1936, the British Union of Fascists led by Oswald Mosley, intended to march through the East End, an area with a large Jewish population. The BUF mustered on and around Tower Hill and hundreds of thousands of local people turned out to block the march. There were violent clashes with the BUF around Tower Hill, but most of the violence occurred as police tried to clear a route through the crowds for the BUF to follow.

The police fought protesters at nearby Cable Street – the series of clashes becoming known as the Battle of Cable Street – and Tower Hill, but the largest confrontations took place at Aldgate and Whitechapel, notably at Gardiner's Corner, at the junction of Leman Street, Commercial Street and Whitechapel High Street.

Whitechapel remained poor through the first half of the 20th century, though somewhat less desperately so. It suffered great damage from enemy bombers during the Blitz, and from the subsequent German V-weapon attacks. The parish church, St Mary Matfelon, was badly damaged in a raid on 29 December 1940, a raid so damaging that it caused the Second Great Fire of London.  

The remains were demolished in 1952. St Mary's traced stone footprint and former graveyard remain, as part of Altab Ali Park.

On 4th May 1978, three teenagers murdered Altab Ali, a 24 year old Bangladesh-born clothing worker, in a racially motivated attack, as he walked home after work. The attack took place on Adler Street, by St Mary's Churchyard, where St Mary Matfelon had previously stood. The reaction to his murder provoked the mass mobilisation of the local Bengali community. The gardens of the former churchyard were later renamed Altab Ali Park in his memory.

The Metropolitan line between Hammersmith and Whitechapel was withdrawn in 1990 and shown separately as a new line called the Hammersmith & City line.

21st century

Crossrail calls at Whitechapel station on the Elizabeth line. Eastbound services will be split into two branches after leaving the historic station which underwent a massive redevelopment that started in 2010.

In order to prepare for Crossrail, in January 2016, the old Whitechapel station was closed for refurbishment and modernisation work in order to improve services and increase capacity in the station.

The Royal London Hospital was closed and re-opened behind the original site in 2012 in a brand new building costing £650m. The old site was then repurchased by the local council to open a new town hall, replacing the existing Town Hall at Mulberry Place.

In March 2022, Whitechapel station signs had "হোয়াইটচ্যাপেল" in Bengali installed. The British-Pakistani Mayor of London Sadiq Khan was "delighted" that the signage was installed ahead of Bangladesh Independence Day on 26 March. The installation was attended by not only Bangladeshi diplomats, but also Mamata Banerjee, the Chief Minister of West Bengal.

Also in 2022 a historical marker was placed in Whitechapel, on the site of the former Adler House at the junction of Adler and Coke Streets by the Jewish American Society for Historic Preservation U.K. Branch. Adler House was named in honour of the Chief Rabbi of the British Empire, Herman Adler, 1891–1911. The marker recognises the significance of Whitechapel as the centre of British Jewish refugee life in the late 19th and early 20th centuries.

Governance

Local council facilities will be grouped within the old Royal London Hospital building as a civic centre. The local library, now called an Idea Store is located on Whitechapel Road.

Culture

Whitechapel Road was the location of two 19th-century theatres: The Effingham (1834–1897) and The Pavilion Theatre (1828–1935; building demolished in 1962). Charles Dickens Jr. (eldest child of Charles Dickens), in his 1879 book Dickens's Dictionary of London, described the Pavilion this way: "A large East-end theatre capable of holding considerably over 3,000 persons. Melodrama of a rough type, farce, pantomime, &c." In the early 20th century it became the home of Yiddish theatre, catering to the large Jewish population of the area, and gave birth to the Anglo-Jewish 'Whitechapel Boys' avant-garde literary and artistic movement.

Since at least the 1970s, Whitechapel and other nearby parts of East London have figured prominently in London's art scene. Probably the area's most prominent art venue is the Whitechapel Art Gallery, founded in 1901 and long an outpost of high culture in a poor neighbourhood. As the neighbourhood has gentrified, it has gained citywide, and even international, visibility and support. From 2005 the gallery underwent a major expansion, with the support of £3.26 million from the Heritage Lottery Fund. The expanded facility opened in 2009.

Whitechapel in the early 21st century has figured prominently in London's punk rock and skuzz rock scenes, with the main focal point for this scene being Whitechapel Factory and Rhythm Factory bar, restaurant, and nightclub. This scene includes the likes of The Libertines, Zap!, Nova, The Others, Razorlight, and The Rakes, all of whom have had some commercial success in the music charts.

Demographics
Bangladeshis are the largest ethnic group in the area, making up 40% of the Whitechapel ward total population. The East London Mosque at the end of Whitechapel Road is one of the largest mosques in Europe. The mosque group was established as early as 1910, and the demand for a mosque grew as the Sylheti community grew rapidly over the years.

In 1985 this large, purpose built mosque with a dome and minaret was built in the heart of Whitechapel, attracting thousands of worshippers every week, and it was further expanded with the London Muslim Centre in 2004. 

A library, the Whitechapel Idea Store, constructed in 2005 at a cost of £12 million by William Verry to a design by David Adjaye, was nominated for the 2006 Stirling Prize.

In literature

Whitechapel features in Charles Dickens's Pickwick Papers (chapter 22) as the location of the Bull Inn, where the Pickwickians take a coach to Ipswich. En route, driving along Whitechapel Road, Sam Weller opines that it is "not a wery nice neighbourhood" and notes the correlation between poverty and the abundance of oyster stalls here. One of Fagin's dens in Dickens's Oliver Twist was located in Whitechapel and Fagin, himself, was possibly based on a notorious local 'fence' named Ikey Solomon (1785–1850).

Whitechapel is also the setting of several novels by Jewish authors such as Children of the Ghetto and The King of Schnorrers by Israel Zangwill and Jew Boy by Simon Blumenfeld. Several chapters of Sholem Aleichem's classic Yiddish novel Adventures of Mottel the Cantor's Son take place in early 20th-century Whitechapel, depicted from the point of view of an impoverished East European Jewish family fleeing the pogroms. The novel Journey Through a Small Planet by Emanuel Litvinoff vividly describes Whitechapel and its Jewish inhabitants in the 1920s and 1930s.

The prostitute and daughter of a Luddite leader Sybil Gerard, main character of William Gibson and Bruce Sterling's novel The Difference Engine comes from Whitechapel. The novel's plot begins there.

One of the episodes in Michael Moorcock's novel Breakfast in the Ruins takes place in 1905 Whitechapel, described from the point of view of an eleven year old Jewish refugee from Poland, working with his parents at a sweatshop, who is caught up in the deadly confrontation between Russian revolutionaries and agents of the Czar's Secret Police.

Brick Lane, the 2003 novel by Monica Ali is based in Whitechapel and documents the life of a young Bangladeshi woman's experience of living in Tower Hamlets in the 1990s and early 2000s.

Whitechapel is used as a location in most Jack the Ripper fiction. One such example is the bizarre White Chappel Scarlet Tracings (1987) by Iain Sinclair. It also features as the setting for the science fiction Webcomic FreakAngels, written by popular comics writer Warren Ellis.

Whitechapel is one of the worldwide locations referenced in Edith Piaf's song C'est a Hambourg , describing the harsh life of prostitutes.

In 2002, Whitechapel was used as the setting for a Sherlock Holmes film, The Case of the Whitechapel Vampire, based on the Arthur Conan Doyle story The Adventure of the Sussex Vampire.

Whitechapel serves as the setting for the television series Ripper Street, which aired 2013–2016.

Education

Transport

History
The East London line extension northwards to Highbury & Islington and southwards to West Croydon was completed in 2010. A further extension opened in 2012 to provide a complete rail ring route around south London to Clapham Junction. Whitechapel is also scheduled to be a stop on the Crossrail project, for which preparatory works began in September 2010 at a large site excavating 'Cambridge Heath Shaft' (located at the eastern end of the Crossrail platform tunnels and adjacent to the junction of Whitechapel Road and Cambridge Heath Road, with Sainsbury's superstore and car park to the north-west of the site and The Blind Beggar public house immediately to the west).

Current
Whitechapel is the main station in the district which is
on the London Underground Hammersmith & City and District lines east–west and also the East London Line and connecting South London Line services north–south (re-opened as London Overground in June 2010)

The Docklands Light Railway (Bank/Tower Gateway branch) and London, Tilbury and Southend line passes through Whitechapel to the south but there are presently no stations.

London Buses 15, 25, 106, 115, 135, 205, 254, D3, N15, N205, N253, N550 and N551 all operate within the area.

Whitechapel is connected to the National Road Network by both the A11 on Whitechapel Road in the centre and to the south the A13 and The Highway A1203 running east–west.

Cycle Superhighway CS2 runs from Aldgate to Stratford on the A11.

Nearest places

Districts
 Bethnal Green
 City of London
 Shadwell
 Stepney
 Spitalfields
 Tower Hill
 Wapping
Mile End

Notable natives or residents
In addition to the prominent figures detailed in the article:

Born in Whitechapel
 Damon Albarn – musician, lead singer of Blur and co-creator of virtual cartoon rock band Gorillaz, born 1968
 John Hoppner, artist 
 Julius Stafford Baker, cartoonist
Abraham Beame, first Jewish mayor of New York City, 1906–2001
 Jack Kid Berg, boxer, "The Whitechapel Windmill", British Lightweight Champion 1934
 Stanley Black, bandleader, 1913–2002.
 Simon Blumenfeld, novelist, playwright and columnist, 1907–2005.
 Georgia Brown (born Lillian Klot), actress and singer, 1933–1992
 Tina Charles, 1970s disco artist, born 1954
 Peter Cheyney, mystery writer and journalist, 1896–1951
 Jack Cohen, Anglo-Jewish businessman who founded the Tesco supermarket chain, 1898–1979
 Ashley Cole, Chelsea and England footballer 1980
 Jack "Spot" Comer, Jewish gangster and anti-Fascist, 1912–1996
 Roger Delgado, actor (known for playing "The Master" in Doctor Who), 1918–1973
 Lloyd Doyley, footballer
 Bud Flanagan, (born Chaim Reuven Weintrop), music hall comedian on stage, radio, film and television, 1896–1968
 Micky Flanagan, comedian
 Kemal Izzet, footballer
 Muzzy Izzet, footballer
 Kenney Jones, drummer
 Morris Kestelman, artist
 Charlie Lee, Leyton Orient footballer
 Emanuel Litvinoff, Anglo-Jewish author of Journey Through a Small Planet
 Margaret Pepys (née Kite), mother of diarist Samuel Pepys, d. 1667
 Brendan Perry, founding member of music group Dead Can Dance
 Abe Saperstein, founder of the Harlem Globetrotters basketball team
 Barry Silkman (born 1952), footballer
 Sarah Taylor, cricketer
 Alan Tilvern, film and television actor, 1918–2003
 Anwar Uddin, captain of Dagenham and Redbridge
 Gary Webster, actor

Resident in or otherwise associated with Whitechapel
 Altab Ali, murdered in a Whitechapel park in 1978
 Barney Barnato, diamond mining industrialist and Randlord, 1851–1897
Richard Brandon (? – 20 June 1649), the reputed executioner of King Charles I was buried at the Whitechapel parish church of St Mary Matfelon. The church register records that he lived in Rosemary Lane (modern Royal Mint Street).
 Mary Hughes (1860–1941), a voluntary parish worker who initially lived in the Blackwall Buildings before moving to a converted pub on Vallance Road where she offered food and shelter to the needy.
 Jack the Ripper, serial killer
 Charles Lahr (1885–1971), German-born anarchist, London bookseller and publisher, secretary of the Whitechapel branch of the Industrial Union of Direct Actionists (IUDA)
 Jack London, who wrote The People of the Abyss while staying in Whitechapel – an account of his 1902 stay amongst the East End poor
 Richard Parker, Royal Navy mutineer buried in St Mary Matfelon
 Rudolf Rocker, anarcho-syndicalist writer, historian and prominent activist, active in Whitechapel 1895–1918, 1873–1958
 Obadiah Shuttleworth, composer, violinist and organist of the parish church, d. 1734
 Avrom Stencl (1897–1983), Polish-born Yiddish poet, early companion of Franz Kafka, published Loshn and Lebn in Whitechapel

Future developments
Whitechapel Market and the A11 corridor is currently the subject of a £20 million investment to improve the public spaces along the route. The London Boroughs of Tower Hamlets & Newham are working with English Heritage and Transport for London to refurbish the historic buildings at this location and improve the market.

See also

 British Bangladeshi
 Stepney Historical Trust
 Whitechapel Mount

Notes

References

External links
 Official website for the ward of Whitechapel
 Primary source articles
 Tower Hamlets History Online
 Nighttime photos of Whitechapel and environs. Commentary is in German, but it is mostly photos.

 
Areas of London
Districts of the London Borough of Tower Hamlets
District centres of London